Arthroleptella is a genus of frogs known as moss frogs in the family Pyxicephalidae. The ten species of this genus are endemic to South Africa.

It contains the following species:
 Arthroleptella atermina Turner and Channing, 2017 - Riviersonderent moss frog
 Arthroleptella bicolor Hewitt, 1926 – Bainskloof moss frog
 Arthroleptella draconella Turner and Channing, 2017 – Drakenstein moss frog
 Arthroleptella drewesii Channing, Hendricks and Dawood, 1994 – Drewes' moss frog
 Arthroleptella kogelbergensis Turner and Channing, 2017 – Kogelsberg moss frog
 Arthroleptella landdrosia Dawood and Channing, 2000 – Landdros moss frog
 Arthroleptella lightfooti (Boulenger, 1910) – Lightfoot's moss frog
 Arthroleptella rugosa Turner and Channing, 2008 – Rough moss frog
 Arthroleptella subvoce Turner, de Villiers, Dawood and Channing, 2004 – Northern moss frog
 Arthroleptella villiersi Hewitt, 1935 – De Villiers' moss frog

Two other species were formerly classified as Arthroleptella before recently found to belong to the formerly monotypic genus Anhydrophryne (Dawood and Stam 2006):

 Arthroleptella hewitti → Anhydrophryne hewitti (FitzSimons, 1947) – Hewitt's moss frog
 Arthroleptella ngongoniensis → Anhydrophryne ngongoniensis (Bishop and Passmore, 1993) – Ngoni moss frog

References

 
Pyxicephalidae
Amphibians of Sub-Saharan Africa
Endemic fauna of South Africa
Amphibian genera
Taxa named by John Hewitt (herpetologist)
Taxonomy articles created by Polbot